Sesame Street: Elmo's A-to-Zoo Adventure is a Sesame Street video game developed by American company Black Lantern Studios, released on October 19, 2010 from Warner Bros. Interactive Entertainment for Microsoft Windows, Wii, and Nintendo DS.  It also shared the same release date, developer and platforms as Sesame Street: Cookie's Counting Carnival.

The Nintendo versions utilize motion controls via the Wii Remote or touchscreen, and are packaged with special plush covers for the Wii Remote or Nintendo DS stylus to make it more comfortable to hold for players of the game's intended age.  The PC version is primarily played with point and click mouse controls.

Gameplay
There are 17 minigames in the Wii and PC and 16 minigames in the Nintendo DS version and 14 minigames in all the versions.

References

2010 video games
Nintendo DS games
Sesame Street video games
Video games developed in the United States
Warner Bros. video games
Wii games
Windows games
Children's educational video games
Black Lantern Studios games
Multiplayer and single-player video games